Essington is a village and civil parish in South Staffordshire, England.

Essington may also refer to:

Films

 Essington (film), a film directed by Julian Pringle

People
 John Essington (disambiguation)
 Thurlow Essington (1886–1964), American lawyer and politician
 William Essington (c. 1753 – 1816), Royal Navy admiral
 Essington Lewis (1881–1961), Australian industrialist

Places
 Essington, a community in Tinicum Township, Delaware County, Pennsylvania, in the United States
 Port Essington, a former settlement in the Northern Territory in Australia
 Port Essington, British Columbia, a town in Canada
 Essington Hall, a former plantation in Maryland, United States
 Essington, Westmead, a former homestead in a suburb of Sydney, New South Wales, Australia

Ships
 , more than one British ship of the Royal Navy

Sports
 Essington Rugby Union Football Club, an English rugby union team